Myroslav Bilosyuk (born July 29, 1985) is a cross-country skier from Ukraine.

Performances

External links

1985 births
Living people
Ukrainian male cross-country skiers
Tour de Ski skiers
Place of birth missing (living people)